The 2022 UT Arlington Mavericks softball team represented the University of Texas at Arlington during the 2022 NCAA Division I softball season. The Mavericks played their home games at Allan Saxe Field. The Mavericks were led by fifth, and final, year head coach Peejay Brun and were members of the Sun Belt Conference.

Preseason

Sun Belt Conference Coaches Poll
The Sun Belt Conference Coaches Poll was released on January 31, 2022. UT Arlington was picked to finish fifth in the conference with 49 votes.

National Softball Signing Day

Personnel

Schedule and results

Schedule Source:
*Rankings are based on the team's current ranking in the NFCA/USA Softball poll.

References

UT Arlington
UT Arlington Mavericks softball
UT Arlington Mavericks softball seasons